Meera is a 1992 Indian Tamil-language film directed by P. C. Sreeram in his directorial debut and written by M. R. Bharathi. The film stars Aishwarya as the title character along Vikram ,  while Tarun, Poornam Viswanathan, Gandhimathi, Janagaraj, and Chinni Jayanth play supporting roles. Nassar and Sarathkumar make friendly appearances, and the latter has a cameo appearance. The music was composed by Ilaiyaraaja with cinematography by P. C. Sreeram and editing by B. Lenin and V. T. Vijayan. The film released on 18 December 1992.

Plot 
Meera is in college and pregnant nearing labour. Here, she tells her story of how she got to this point in a flashback.

A young man named Jeeva falls in love with her. She despises him and eventually gets him kicked out of college. After a fight with Jeeva near her house, Meera goes out for a walk and sees a woman getting killed by a policeman. She is terrified and runs to the police station to report the crime. Unfortunately for her, the officer at the station is, shockingly, the murderer. The officer, knowing the sole witness to his crime, sends goons to her house to kill her.

By then, Meera has already left and is on the run. Jeeva goes to Meera's house and finds the maid getting beaten by the goons. There is a fight between Jeeva and the goons. Jeeva wins, and the maid tells him that he should go after Meera. They are now on the run, and the murderer sends six professional killers after the duo. Along the way, Meera and Jeeva get arrested by a comedic policeman and later flee. They find a blacksmith and are freed of the handcuffs but are almost killed by the goons in the shootout.

Meera leaves Jeeva but has a change of heart and comes back. She finds the goons who have Jeeva, and the goons tie them together on train tracks. They narrowly escape. After this event, Meera admits her love for Jeeva. After a run-in with the murderer, Meera and Jeeva end up in the ocean and wash up near the house of a boy named Jesu and his grandfather. They seek refuge there, and Meera gets close with Jesu. While everyone is getting ready for Jesu's birthday, his dog runs off into the forest. The goons kill the dog and go after Meera. Meera and Jesu flee on his bike, but they fall off, and Jesu gets killed.

Jeeva takes revenge and kills the goons in gruesome ways. A final showdown occurs between the murderer and Jeeva. The murderer gets the upper hand and almost succeeds, but Meera shoots him and Jeeva sets him on fire.

The final scene is a group photo with everyone, and Meera goes into labour.

Cast 

 Vikram as Jeeva
 Aishwarya as Meera
 Master Tarun as Jesu 
 Janagaraj as Comic Inspector
 Chinni Jayanth as the Comic Inspector's assistant
 Poornam Viswanathan as Meera's father
 Ganthimathi as Jeeva's mother
 Delhi Ganesh
 Idichapuli Selvaraj
 Mayilsamy
 Nassar as Village Head 
 Vennira Aadai Moorthy as College Principal (guest appearance)
 Sarathkumar as the policeman who murders the woman (guest appearance)
 K. V. Anand as Jeeva's friend (uncredited)

Production
The film marked the first high-profile project for Vikram, with the actor revealing that it was the first time he had worked on big sets.

Soundtrack 
The music was composed by Ilaiyaraaja, with lyrics by Vaali. The song "O Butterfly" is set in Natabhairavi, a Carnatic raga.

Reception 
RPR of Kalki negatively reviewed the film, and said viewers needed Amrutanjan to cure the headaches they would receive from watching it.

References

External links 
 

1990s Tamil-language films
1992 directorial debut films
1992 films
Films scored by Ilaiyaraaja